Albert Drinkwater (28 September 1895 – 27 July 1947) was an Australian rules footballer for  in the Victorian Football League (VFL).

He played his final VFL match in 1920 having played 27 matches.

References

1895 births
Essendon Football Club players
Australian rules footballers from Victoria (Australia)
1947 deaths